Cossula oletta is a moth in the family Cossidae. It is found in Brazil.

References

Natural History Museum Lepidoptera generic names catalog

Cossulinae
Moths described in 1937